Walter Kaaden (1 September 1919 – 3 March 1996) was a German engineer who improved the performance of two-stroke engines by understanding the role of resonance waves in the exhaust system. Working for the MZ Motorrad- und Zweiradwerk part of the Industrieverband Fahrzeugbau (IFA), he laid the foundations of the modern two-stroke engine. His understanding of gas flow and resonance enabled him to make the first engine to achieve 200BHP/litre with his 1961 125cc racer. His motorcycle engines were ridden to 13 Grand Prix victories and a further 105 podium finishes between 1955 and 1976. 
   
Walter Kaaden was born in Pobershau, Saxony, Germany. His father worked as chauffeur to the sales manager at the DKW factory. At eight years old he attended the opening of the Nürburgring racing circuit, a formative event to which he later attributed his enthusiasm for engineering.

Kaaden studied at the Technical Academy in Chemnitz. In 1940 he joined the Henschel aircraft factory at Berlin-Schönefeld working under Herbert A. Wagner, the designer of the Hs 293 radio-guided rocket-propelled missile. Despite many reports to the contrary, Kaaden did not work on the V-1 flying bomb (the Vergeltungswaffe 1, Fieseler Fi 103) nor under Wernher von Braun on the V-2 German rocket program during the Second World War. From 4 October 1943 he worked at the Peenemünde Army Research Center on the Hs 293 project as a 'flight engineer'. But the bombing of Peenemünde in World War II on 17/18 August 1943 destroyed the facilities there. The Germans then moved missile production and testing into the secure, deep tunnel network built beneath the Harz mountains at the Mittelwerk factory, Dora-Mittelbau Concentration Camp. This is where Kaaden was transferred along with the Hs 293 project.

Kaaden was working near Dora-Mittelbau when he was captured and interned by the Americans at the end of the war. He eventually returned to Zschopau to start a timber business specialising in roof trusses that were in great demand to renovate bomb-damaged buildings. Walter Kaaden built his first racing motorcycle, based on the DKW RT125, which he raced himself in local events in his company's workshop.

In 1953, the IFA asked Kaaden to take over the management of the racing department from Kurt Kampf after the IFA 125cc racers had been outclassed by Bernhard Petruschke riding the private ZPH (Zimmermann-Petruschke-Henkel) machine whenever they had met the previous year.

The independent engineer Daniel Zimmermann (born 1902) also based his ZPH engine on the pre-war DKW RT-125. Zimmermann heavily modified the engine by adding a disc valve that allowed asymmetric port timing with a longer duration inlet phase. Zimmermann also used a new crankshaft providing 'square' bore and stroke dimensions (54mm x 54mm) and used stuffing rings to boost the primary compression ratio. However, the East German government didn't like the competition between the two East Germans and persuaded Zimmermann to reveal his engine's secrets to Kaaden. The result was the 1953 IFA racer that featured a rotary disc valve - as per Zimmermann. This two stroke 125cc racing engine was producing 13 bhp, more than 100 bhp/litre. This engine was further developed to produce 25 bhp at 10,800rev/min.

In 1955, Kaaden turned his attention to the expansion chambers invented by Erich Wolf (the DKW designer) that had first appeared on DKW's 1951 racers. Kurt Kampf had copied and fitted replicas of Wolf's design to the 1952 IFA racers. Working with extremely limited resources, in 1955, Kaaden developed the expansion chamber idea using an oscilloscope to examine the resonance in the exhaust system. From this he devised profiles to maximise the engine's efficiency.

References

Further reading

1919 births
1996 deaths
People from Marienberg
Engineers from Saxony
German motorcycle designers
Two-stroke engine technology
Recipients of the Patriotic Order of Merit
East German scientists